Emilie Mediz-Pelikan (2 December 1861, Vöcklabruck - 19 March 1908, Dresden) was an Austrian landscape painter. Many of her works show some Symbolist influence.

Biography 

Her father was a government financial officer. In 1883, she became the last private student of the landscape painter, Albert Zimmermann, who she had earlier assisted in Salzburg. Two years later, she accompanied him to Munich, where he died in 1888. She also lived at the artists' colony in Dachau, where she worked with Adolf Hölzel and Fritz von Uhde. Later, she spent time in Paris and the artists' colony in Knokke. 

In Dachau, she had made the acquaintance of a Viennese painter named Karl Mediz and met  him again at Knokke. In 1891, they went to Vienna and were married, but had little success there. At first, they moved to Krems an der Donau, where their daughter was born. In 1894, they decided to settle in Dresden.

They made numerous trips to Tyrolia, Italy and the Adriatic coast. In 1898, she finally had a major showing at the first exhibition of the Vienna Secession. In 1901, this was followed by a showing at the Internationale Kunstausstellung in Dresden. She and Karl had a joint exhibition in 1903, sponsored by the Hagenbund. She also had two major exhibitions at the Berlin Künstlerhaus.

In 1908, aged only forty-seven, she died suddenly of heart failure. The collaboration with her husband had been very intense; he and his work never fully recovered. Although much of her work was in the hands of the Staatliche Kunstsammlungen Dresden, he refused to allow any exhibitions. After his death, her paintings passed into the possession of the East German government and were forgotten.

Her work was included in the 2019 exhibition City Of Women: Female artists in Vienna from 1900 to 1938 at the Österreichische Galerie Belvedere.

References

Further reading
 Erich Tromayer: Emilie Mediz-Pelikan. Bilder, Briefe, Gedanken. Self-published, Vienna,  1986
 Daniela Nittenberg: Das Frühwerk der Emilie Mediz-Pelikan. Thesis, University of Vienna, 1990
 Therese Backhausen: Ménage à trois. Emilie Mediz-Pelikan und Karl Mediz, Doctoral Dissertation, University of Salzburg, 2008

External links 

ArtNet: More works by Mediz-Pelikan.

1861 births
1908 deaths
19th-century Austrian painters
20th-century Austrian painters
Austrian women painters
Austrian landscape painters
Symbolist artists
People from Vöcklabruck